Æbbe was a saint venerated in medieval Oxfordshire. St Ebbe's church in the southern English city of Oxford had been verifiably dedicated to the saint by 1091.  It is believed that she represents a rare southern expression of the cult of the Northumbrian abbess and saint, Æbbe of Coldingham, to whom the church at Shelswell, also in Oxfordshire, was dedicated.

It has also been argued by several historians that Æbbe of Oxford is the same Æbbe as the conjectured abbess-saint who gave her name to nearby Abingdon ("hill of Æbbe").

Notes

References

Anglo-Saxon abbesses
History of Berkshire
History of Oxfordshire
People from Abingdon-on-Thames
People from Oxford
Religion in Berkshire
Religion in Oxfordshire
West Saxon saints